Magudam is a 1992 Indian Tamil language film, written and directed by Pratap Pothen. It stars Sathyaraj, Bhanupriya and Gautami. The film was released on 24 July 1992.

Plot 
Muthuvelu was brought up by his grandmother and his grandmother does not permit him talk to girls. One night Muthuvelu meets Thilakavathi and he gets scared thinking that she is a ghost as she was wearing white dress. Then he understands that she is a human.

When she tries to drink poison he stops her and ask her why she is committing suicide. She says that she was a medical student and her chief asked her to conduct a post-mortem on a woman. She was coerced into reporting that it was a case of suicide, but she conclusively proved that the woman was killed and that it was done by her husband Thillainathan. For this, Thillainathan spoiled Thilaka's name, killed her mother and tried to kill her also. She did not want to die at their hands, so she decided to commit suicide.

Muthuvelu wants to help her. Soon after the two fall in love. He also convinces his grandmother and she says that Thilaka should continue her studies, for which Velu will help. Muthu was arrested by police, framed by Thillainathan. In that period, he loses his land to Thillainathan. When he returns from jail, he is thinking of taking revenge on Thillainathan. He forms a gang and he becomes a local rowdy. Meanwhile, Thilaka becomes a doctor. Then comes Bhavani, a mischievous girl, who falls in love with Velu and troubles him to marry her. Meanwhile, Thillainathan tries to kill Muthu by shooting him, but Bhavani saves him and is hurt as he shoots her. At the hospital, the doctor says that she is going to die and asks her brother to fulfill her last wish. She says that she wants to die as Muthu's wife and Muthu marries Bhavani. Unfortunately, she was saved by Thilaka and Thilaka's heart was broken knowing that Muthu was Bhavani's husband. She stops her marriage and his grandmother also hates him without knowing about his marriage and goes with Thilaka. Thilaka maintains a good friendship with Bhavani and solves her family problems. Meanwhile, Thillainathan tries to kill Muthu in many ways. Bhavani gives birth to a child. Finally, Thillainathan kidnaps Muthu's child, grandmother, Bhavani and Thilakavathi. Muthu and Bhavani's brother comes to rescue them. In this process, Bhavani is shot by Thillainathan, whose last words are that Muthu should marry Thilaka and Thilaka should be the mother of her baby. Then she pushes Thillainathan from a rock and she also falls down. They both die. Muthu marries Thilaka.

Cast 
 Sathyaraj as Muthuvelu
 Bhanupriya as Bhavani, wife of Muthu
 Gautami as Dr. Thilakavathi, lover of Muthu
 Manorama as Muthuvelu's grandmother
 Charanraj as Bhavani's brother
 Salim Ghouse as Thilainathan
 Goundamani as Thanisami
 Senthil as Manasthan
 Sridevi as herself (Photographic Appearance Only)

Soundtrack 
The soundtrack was composed by Ilaiyaraaja, with lyrics by Vaali.

Reception 
Malini Mannath of The Indian Express wrote, "With a weak storyline, an abundance of characters who are never really justified, and a half-hearted treatment, Magudam is a film which never really takes off from the scene one."

References

External links 
 

1990s Tamil-language films
1992 films
Films directed by Pratap Pothen
Films scored by Ilaiyaraaja